The 2005 World Wrestling Entertainment (WWE) draft lottery, the third WWE draft, took place over a four-week period from June 6–30. 

Every wrestler from Raw and SmackDown! was eligible to be drafted, including announcers, commentators, and general managers. There were ten draft picks and an eleven-person trade conducted between the promotion's two brands: Raw and SmackDown!, where twenty-two wrestlers were drafted and traded overall. Draft picks were drawn at (kayfabe) random on WWE's two-hour television programs, each Monday on Raw (on Spike TV) and each Thursday on SmackDown! (on UPN). Post-draft trades were revealed on WWE's official website, wwe.com.

Background
On the April 18, 2005, episode of Raw, WWE chairman Mr. McMahon scheduled a draft lottery for the following month in May. However, on the May 16 episode of Raw, McMahon postponed the draft to June. He noted that there were no exceptions from the draft, including the injured and the champions.

Selections

Draft lottery
{| class="wikitable sortable" style="width: 50%"
|-
!width=0%  | Pick No. 
!width=15% | Brand (to)
!width=45% | Wrestler
!width=25% | Role
!width=15% | Brand (from)
!width=15% | Day of selection
|-
|1
|style="background:#ffd0bd"|Raw
|John Cena (then-WWE Champion)
|Male wrestler
|style="background:#ccf"|SmackDown!
|June 6 (Raw)
|-
|2
|style="background:#ccf"|SmackDown!
|Chris Benoit
|Male wrestler
|style="background:#ffd0bd"|Raw
|June 9 (SmackDown!)
|-
|3
|style="background:#ffd0bd"|Raw
|Kurt Angle
|Male wrestler
|style="background:#ccf"|SmackDown!
|June 13 (Raw)
|-
|4
|style="background:#ccf"|SmackDown!
|Randy Orton
|Male wrestler
|style="background:#ffd0bd"|Raw
|June 16 (SmackDown!)
|-
|5 
|style="background:#ffd0bd"|Raw
|Carlito
|Male wrestler
|style="background:#ccf"|SmackDown!
|June 20 (Raw)
|-
|6
|style="background:#ccf"|SmackDown!
|Muhammad Hassan and Khosrow Daivari
|Male wrestler
|style="background:#ffd0bd"|Raw
|June 23 (SmackDown!)
|-
|7
|style="background:#ffd0bd"|Raw
|Big Show
|Male wrestler
|style="background:#ccf"|SmackDown!
June 27 (Raw)
|-
|8
|style="background:#ffd0bd"|Raw
|Rob Van Dam
|Male wrestler
|style="background:#ccf"|SmackDown!
|-
|9
|style="background:#ccf"|SmackDown!
|Christian
|Male wrestler
|style="background:#ffd0bd"|Raw
June 30 (SmackDown!)
|-
|10
|style="background:#ccf"|SmackDown!
|Batista (then-World Heavyweight Champion)
|Male wrestler
|style="background:#ffd0bd"|Raw
|-
|}

Post-draft trades

1 – Jindrak made only one appearance on Raw.
2 – These people were released from their contracts prior to their debut on Raw.
3 – Guerrero made his return on the July 4 edition of Raw repackaged as Kerwin White. The gimmick was later abandoned in November 2005 after the death of Eddie Guerrero.

Aftermath
This was the first draft in which champions brought their titles to their new show if they were selected. After John Cena was drafted to Raw, along with the WWE Championship, SmackDown! was left without a world title for the remainder of the month of June. As a result, on the June 23, 2005 episode, General Manager, Theodore Long, announced the creation of new world title, called the SmackDown! Championship. The new champion would have been determined in a six-man elimination match between The Undertaker, Muhammad Hassan, Christian, Booker T, John "Bradshaw" Layfield and Chris Benoit, which Layfield won on the June 30, 2005 episode of SmackDown!. After Layfield won the match, Long declared that the SmackDown! Championship was not needed because the then-World Heavyweight Champion, Batista, had been drafted to SmackDown!.

See also
List of WWE personnel

References

Wwe Draft Lottery, 2005
WWE draft
June 2005 events in the United States